Dalma Mall is a shopping mall located in Abu Dhabi, United Arab Emirates. The mall is prominently situated on the Abu Dhabi–Tarif–Al Ain highway, opposite Mohammed Bin Zayed City. A short distance from Maqta Bridge and Abu Dhabi International Airport, Dalma Mall features over 450 stores and kiosks. The mall opened on 10 October 2010.

Description
Dalma Mall is part of the strategic plan of Abu Dhabi 2030 which sets out the framework of the Emirate's long-term growth. Market research has shown that the rapidly developing region surrounding Dalma Mall has evolved into a large multi-cultural, middle-class population, and the mall has fulfilled the requirements of the surrounding population.

Construction

Dalma Mall is owned by The Developers LLC. The mall has a total built-up area of 250,000 square metres and a total gross leasable area of 155,000 square meters. The mall which opened in 2010, features stores such as Carrefour, Dar Al Shifaa DayCare Surgery Hospital, Home Centre, Centrepoint and Marks & Spencer, H&M, 2XL, Ace Hardware's, Jarir Bookstore, Emax, Fitness First, Forever21, ID Design, Red Tag, Max Fashion, Matalan, Brands, Twenty4, Ecity, Debenhams, and others.

Entertainment
Visitors to Dalma Mall are able to experience a broad range of entertainment comprising a series of activities.

Fun City

Fun City is a play center for children between the ages of 1 and 12 years. Divided into age-appropriate areas, Fun n Learn is designed for children aged 0–4 and provides outlets for children's mental and physical development. PlayZone, the soft-play area meanwhile, provides a safe and secure place for children to play.

Cine Royal

Dalma Mall hosts Abu Dhabi's largest Cineplex, the 14-screen CineRoyal Cinemas. The cinema has 2,200 seats and an unprecedented cine-going experience including VIP halls and 3D screening.

Adventure HQ
Adventure HQ is an outdoor adventure, sporting and fitness specialist offering equipment for a wide range of active lifestyle pursuits including fishing, diving, camping, hiking, cycling and water sports.

Photo gallery

References

Bibliography
 

2010 establishments in the United Arab Emirates
Shopping malls established in 2010
Shopping malls in Abu Dhabi